Anfitriões is a comedy written by the Portuguese poet Luís de Camões and published in 1587.

It is written in the form of an auto (a one-act morality play) and is as an adaptation of Plautus' Amphitryon, where a comic character is added to the myth of Amphitryon, highlighting the omnipotence of love which even the immortal gods are subject to, in accordance with the Vicentian Tradition.

References 

Portuguese plays
1587 plays
Plays based on works by Plautus